Sandıklıspor , formerly known as Sandıklı Belediyespor, is a football club located in Afyonkarahisar, Turkey. The club was promoted to the TFF Third League after the 2010–11 season.

League participations

Stadium 
Currently the team plays at the 2.500 capacity Sandıklı İlçe Stadium.

Current squad

References

External links 
Sandıklıspor on TFF.org

TFF Third League clubs
Football clubs in Turkey